As baicalin is a flavone glycoside, it is a flavonoid. It is the glucuronide of baicalein.

Natural occurrences 
Baicalin is found in several species in the genus Scutellaria, including Scutellaria baicalensis, and Scutellaria lateriflora. There are 10 mg/g baicalin in Scutellaria galericulata leaves. It is also present in the bark isolate of the Oroxylum indicum tree.

Medical uses 
Baicalin is one of the chemical ingredients of at least two herbal supplements: Shuanghuanglian and Sho-Saiko-To, which is a Chinese classic herbal formula, and listed in Japan as Kampo medicine.

Baicalin, along with its aglycone baicalein, is a positive allosteric modulator of the benzodiazepine site and/or a non-benzodiazepine site of the GABAA receptor. In mice, baicalin produces anxiolytic effects without sedative or myorelaxant effects. It is thought that baicalin, along with other flavonoids, may underlie the anxiolytic effects of S. baicalensis and S. lateriflora.

Baicalin is a known prolyl endopeptidase inhibitor. It induces apoptosis in pancreatic cancer cells.

References

Anxiolytics
Flavone glycosides
Flavonoid glucuronides
Glucuronide esters
GABAA receptor positive allosteric modulators